The 2016 PGA Tour Latinoamérica was the fifth season of PGA Tour Latinoamérica, having converted from the Tour de las Américas which ceased to operate in 2012. PGA Tour Latinoamérica is operated and run by the PGA Tour.

Schedule changes
The number of tournaments remained at 18. Two events were dropped from the schedule: the Mundo Maya Open and the TransAmerican Power Products CRV Open. Two events were added: the Honduras Open and the PGA Tour Latinoamérica Tour Championship. The season finale is reserved for the top 60 players on the Order of Merit.

Schedule
The following table lists official events during the 2016 season.

Unofficial events
The following events were sanctioned by the PGA Tour Latinoamérica, but did not carry official money, nor were wins official.

Order of Merit
The Order of Merit was based on prize money won during the season, calculated in U.S. dollars. The top five players on the tour earned status to play on the 2017 Web.com Tour.

Developmental Series
The following table lists Developmental Series events during the 2016 season.

See also
2016 in golf

Notes

References

PGA Tour Latinoamérica
PGA Tour Latinoamerica